Iris 320 is a modified TGV train operated by SNCF International as a dedicated track recording train for high-speed railways. It was converted from former SNCF TGV Réseau passenger train number 4530.

The train is primarily used for monitoring the whole of the French high-speed LGV network every 15 days.  In addition it surveys other main lines in France operating at above  and the HSL 1 high-speed line in Belgium for Infrabel.

Once every two months, Iris 320 takes a survey of the Channel Tunnel for Eurotunnel (since December 2010) and of High Speed 1 for Network Rail (Channel Tunnel Rail Link) in the United Kingdom (since 4/5 May 2011).

See also
 New Measurement Train, a British departmental train operated by Network Rail for track surveying, based on the British Rail Class 43 HST
 Doctor Yellow, the Japanese track surveying Shinkansen
 Comprehensive Inspection Trains, Chinese high speed departmental trains operated on track surveying duties

References

External links

Iris 320
Non-passenger multiple units
Electric multiple units with locomotive-like power cars
Track recording trains